John D. Bassett High School, also known as Bassett Middle School, is a historic school building located at Bassett, Henry County, Virginia. It was built in 1947–1948, and is a two-story Georgian Revival style brick school building. A rear addition was built in 1961. It has three bay portico entrances at each end with cupolas above. They provide public access to the two community spaces on the interior – the auditorium at one end and the gymnasium at the other. The building features a hip roof with slate shingles, gabled dormers and octagonal cupolas; and Flemish-bond variant brickwork with corner quoins and a water table. It was replaced by the Bassett High School in 1979, and continued to operate as a middle school.  The school closed in 2004.

It was listed on the National Register of Historic Places in 2006.

References

School buildings on the National Register of Historic Places in Virginia
Georgian Revival architecture in Virginia
School buildings completed in 1948
Schools in Henry County, Virginia
National Register of Historic Places in Henry County, Virginia